The Sinaloa crow (Corvus sinaloae) is a crow native to western Mexico.

Description 
Visually, it is nearly identical to and the same length (34–38 cm) as the Tamaulipas crow (Corvus imparatus). It has the same purple-glossed, silky, black plumage with a black bill, legs, and feet. The two species differ markedly in voice.

Distribution and habitat
It occurs on the Pacific slope from southern Sonora south to Manzanillo. The crow inhabits coastal regions where it forages on the seashore, semi-desert, open woodlands, river banks and hills up to 300 metres or more. It is very common around coastal towns and villages.

Diet
Food is taken both on the ground and in trees. On the seashore it can be found turning over objects to find its food and it will take a wide range of invertebrates such as small shellfish, crabs, and insects. Fruits of many types are also taken and eggs and nestlings are also on the menu when opportunity arises.

Breeding
Often, this bird will nest in a thorny tree or a tall coconut palm where its nest is said to be similar to the American crow though smaller.

Voice
The voice is radically different from the Tamaulipas crow in that it is quite high-pitched, jay-like, and clear: "ceow". That of the Tamaulipas crow is a surprisingly low, gruff, frog-like croak.

Image links
 Profile of bird

References

Sinaloa crow
Endemic birds of Western Mexico
Sinaloa crow